Norway competed at the 2012 Winter Youth Olympics in Innsbruck, Austria.

Medalists

Alpine skiing

Norway qualified 4 athletes.

Boys

Girls

Team

Biathlon

Norway qualified 4 athletes.

Boys

Girls

Mixed

Cross-country skiing

Norway qualified 4 athletes.

Boys

Girls

Sprint

Mixed

Curling

Norway qualified a team.

Roster
Fourth: Martin Sesaker
Third: Stine Haalien
Skip: Markus Furulund Skogvold
Lead: Ina Roll Backe

Mixed team

Round Robin

Draw 1

Draw 2

Draw 3

Draw 4

Draw 5

Draw 6

Draw 7

Tiebreaker

Quarterfinals

Mixed doubles

Round of 32

Round of 16

Quarterfinals

Semifinals

Gold Medal Game

Freestyle skiing

Norway qualified 3 athletes.

Ski Cross

Ski Half-Pipe

Luge

Norway qualified 2 athletes.

Girls

Nordic combined

Norway qualified 1 athlete.

Boys

Ski jumping

Norway qualified 2 athletes.

Boys

Girls

Team w/Nordic Combined

Speed skating

Norway qualified 4 athletes.

Boys

Girls

See also
Norway at the 2012 Summer Olympics

References

2012 in Norwegian sport
Nations at the 2012 Winter Youth Olympics
Norway at the Youth Olympics